The Diocese of Kaposvár is a Latin Rite suffragan diocese in the Ecclesiastical province of the Metropolitan Archdiocese of Veszprém, in southwestern Hungary.

Its cathedral episcopal, Our Lady of the Assumption Cathedral, is dedicated to the Blessed Virgin Mary, in the city of Kaposvár, capital of Somogy County.

History 
 Established on May 31, 1993 as Diocese of Kaposvár, on territory split off from its future Metropolitan, the then Diocese of Veszprém.

Statistics 
As per 2014, it pastorally served 290,425 Catholics (73.5% of 395,207 total) on 6,764 km² in 102 parishes with 95 priests (diocesan), 4 deacons, 6 lay religious (sisters) and 8 seminarians.

Episcopal ordinaries
(all Roman rite natives)

Suffragan Bishops of Kaposvár
 Béla Balás (31 May 1993 – 25 March 2017), previously Titular Bishop of Feradi maius (1992.08.10 – 1993.05.31) as Auxiliary Bishop of Veszprém (Hungary) (1992.08.10 – 1993.05.31)
 László Varga (13 May 2017 – ...)

See also 
 List of Catholic dioceses in Hungary
 Roman Catholicism in Hungary

Sources 
 GCatholic.org - data for all sections
 Catholic Hierarchy

External links

 

Kaposvár
Roman Catholic dioceses in Hungary
Religious organizations established in 1993
Roman Catholic dioceses and prelatures established in the 20th century
Roman Catholic Ecclesiastical Province of Veszprém